Javier Careaga Tagueña (born November 17, 1967) is a former breaststroke swimmer Olympian from Mexico. As of 2008, he is the ex-president of the Mexican Swimming Federation (la Federación Mexicana de Natación).

International competition

Summer Olympics 
He competed at two consecutive Summer Olympic Games. The first Games were the 1988 Summer Olympics in Seoul, South Korea, as part of the Mexico swimming team. No one on the ten member team at Seoul finished above the "heat" stage of competition. The second Games were the 1992 Summer Olympics in Barcelona, Catalonia, Spain, as part of the Mexico swimming team.

References

1967 births
Living people
Mexican male swimmers
Mexican male breaststroke swimmers
Swimmers at the 1987 Pan American Games
Swimmers at the 1988 Summer Olympics
Swimmers at the 1992 Summer Olympics
Olympic swimmers of Mexico
Pan American Games competitors for Mexico